Two ships of the Royal Navy have been named HMS Leonidas after Leonidas I, king of ancient Sparta.

The first , launched in 1807, built by John Pelham of Frindsbury was a 36-gun fifth-rate frigate, used as a powder hulk from 1872 and sold in 1894.
The second , launched in 1913, was a  destroyer. She served with the 3rd Destroyer Flotilla and as a convoy escort in World War I and was broken up in 1922.

References

Royal Navy ship names
Leonidas I